Leucocytozoon caprimulgi is a species of the genus Leucocytozoon, a genus of parasitic alveolates. It is a  rare parasite of  the European nightjar. Its scarcity and the fact that it is the only one of its genus found in nightjars support the suggestion that it has crossed over from close relatives that normally infect owls.

References 

Haemosporida
Parasites of birds